The 2015–16 Western Illinois Leathernecks women's basketball represent Western Illinois University in the 2015–16 NCAA Division I women's basketball season. The Leathernecks, led by fifth-year head by JD Gravina, play their home games at the Western Hall and are members of The Summit League. They finished the season 16–16, 8–8 in Summit League play to finish in fifth place. They lost in the quarterfinals of The Summit League women's tournament to Oral Roberts. They were invited to the WBI where they defeated Southern Illinois in the first round before losing to USC Upstate in the quarterfinals.

Roster

Schedule

|-
!colspan=9 style="background:#663399; color:#FFD700;"| Exhibition

|-
!colspan=9 style="background:#663399; color:#FFD700;"| Non-conference regular season

|-
!colspan=9 style="background:#663399; color:#FFD700;"| The Summit League regular season

|-
!colspan=9 style="background:#663399; color:#FFD700;"| The Summit League Women's Tournament

|-
!colspan=9 style="background:#663399; color:#FFD700;"| WBI

References

See also
2015–16 Western Illinois Leathernecks men's basketball team

Western Illinois Leathernecks women's basketball seasons
Western Illinois
Western Illinois
Sum
Sum